Lycodon striatus, commonly known as the northern wolf snake or the barred wolf snake, is a species of nonvenomous colubrid snake from southern Asia.

Geographical range
Lycodon striatus is found in Afghanistan, India (Andhra Pradesh, Tamil Nadu, Gujarat, Karnataka, Madhya Pradesh, Maharashtra, Punjab and Uttar Pradesh), eastern and north-eastern Iran, Nepal, Pakistan, Sri Lanka, western Tajikistan, southern Turkmenistan (Kopet Dagh) and Uzbekistan.

Description

Lycodon striatus is dark brown or black above, with white transverse spots or crossbands, which are widely separated anteriorly. The sides are lineolated with white, with a black spot corresponding to each white crossband. The upper lip and ventrum are uniform white (coloration in alcohol).

The head is only slightly distinct from the neck, and the snout is flattened. There are 8 upper labials, the first and second contacting the nasal scale.

Taxonomy
Lycodon striatus was first described in 1802 by George Shaw, as Coluber striatus; its type locality was "Vizagapatam and Hyderabad". Three subspecies are recognised, including the nominate race:

Lycodon striatus bicolor (Nikolsky, 1903) – Pakistan
Lycodon striatus sinhaleyus Deraniyagala, 1955
Lycodon striatus striatus (Shaw, 1802)

Ecology
Lycodon striatus prefers dry regions such as semideserts and forest edges. Snakes of this species are nocturnal. By day they hide under stones, but after dark they emerge to hunt. Lycodon striatus feeds on skinks, geckos and other small lizards.

Reproduction
Adult females lay eggs in April (in India). Parental care of the eggs has been observed.

References

Further reading
 Boulenger, George A. 1890. The Fauna of British India, Including Ceylon and Burma. Reptilia and Batrachia. (Taylor & Francis, Printers). London. xviii + 541 pp.
 Chernov, Sergius A. 1935. New material on the distribution of the Indian snake Lycodon striatus (Shaw) (Ophidia, Colubridae) in Soviet Middle Asia. Comptes Rendus de l'Académie des Sciences de l'URSS 3 (4): 189–192.
 Lanza, B. 1999. A new species of Lycodon from the Philippines, with a key to the genus (Reptilia: Serpentes: Colubridae). Tropical Zoology 12: 89–104.
 Shaw, G. 1802. General Zoology, or Systematic Natural History. Vol.3, part 1 + 2. G. Kearsley (Thomas Davison, Printer). London. pp. 313–615.

striatus
Reptiles described in 1802
Reptiles of Afghanistan
Reptiles of India
Reptiles of Iran
Reptiles of Nepal
Reptiles of Pakistan
Reptiles of Sri Lanka
Reptiles of Central Asia